Weeneebayko Area Health Authority (WAHA) is a health-care network operating hospitals and supporting federal nursing stations in remote communities along the James Bay and Hudson Bay coasts in Northern Ontario, Canada.

History
Created in October 2010, WAHA is the result of a merger between two existing hospitals, Weeneebayko Health Ahtuskaywin and James Bay General Hospital along with a number of smaller community health clinics.

Locations
WAHA operates sites in Moosonee and the First Nation communities of Fort Albany, Attawapiskat, and Moose Factory and supports nursing stations in Kashechewan and Peawanuck.

Weeneebayko General Hospital
Weeneebayko General Hospital is the successor to Weeneebayko Health Ahtuskaywin/Moose Factory General Hospital (c. 1966) and Moose Factory Indian and Inuit Hospital (c. 1950). Weeneebayko Health Ahtuskaywin was a federal funded hospital under Health Canada, where as most hospitals in Ontario are provincially funded.

Weeneebayko General Hospital 37 beds and provides acute care, long-term care, emergency services, mental health, general surgery and family medicine.

Moosonee Health Centre
Moosonee Health Centre provides 24/7 emergency care, outpatient services and weekday clinics .

Fort Albany Hospital
Opened in 1987 as a satellite site of James Bay General. Fort Albany Hospital has 17 beds providing 24/7 care staffed by registered nurses and consulting physicians in its emergency room.

Attawapiskat Hospital
Opened in 1985 as a satellite site of James Bay, Attawapiskat Hospital has 15 beds and provides 24/7 care staffed by registered nurses and consulting physicians in its emergency room.

Nursing Stations
WAHA has a partnership with First Nation and Inuit Health Branch (FNIHB) to support basic care in:

 Kashechewan Nursing Station
 Peawanuck Nursing Station

Both sites are staffed by FNIHB registered nurses and when needed  Ontario primary and/or advanced care paramedics.

Medical Transfers
For more advance care requiring transfers to Moose Factory or further south (Timmins and District Hospital or Kingston General Hospital) Weeneebayko General Hospital in Moose Factory has a helipad located on the south side of the hospital. All other locations require ambulance transfers by Weeneebayko Area Health Authority Paramedic Services to the nearest airport with ORNGE helicopters or other aircraft.

References

External links

Hospitals in Ontario
Hospitals established in 2010
Heliports in Ontario
2010 establishments in Ontario